Pharahadawa  is a village development committee in Sarlahi District in the Janakpur Zone of south-eastern Nepal. At the time of the 1991 Nepal census it had a population of 3,553 people living in 613 individual households.
हरिपुर न.पा.३ फरहदवा को वडा अध्यक्ष क.लाल महम्मद शेष (ने.क.पा.माओबादी केन्द्र)

References

External links
UN map of the municipalities of Sarlahi  District

Populated places in Sarlahi District